The 1987 Chico State Wildcats football team represented California State University, Chico as a member of the Northern California Athletic Conference (NCAC) during the 1987 NCAA Division II football season. Led by fourth-year head coach Mike Bellotti, Chico State compiled an overall record of 3–6 with a mark of 3–2 in conference play, placing second in the NCAC. The team was outscored by its opponents 174 to 155 for the season. The Wildcats played home games at University Stadium in Chico, California.

Schedule

Team players in the NFL
The following Chico State players were selected in the 1988 NFL Draft.

References

Chico State
Chico State Wildcats football seasons
Chico State Wildcats football